Oscar Nathan Straus (6 March 1870 – 11 January 1954) was a Viennese composer of operettas, film scores, and songs. He also wrote about 500 cabaret songs, chamber music, and orchestral and choral works. His original name was actually Strauss, but for professional purposes he deliberately omitted the final 's'. He wished not to be associated with the musical Strauss family of Vienna. However, he did follow the advice of Johann Strauss II in 1898 about abandoning the prospective lure of writing waltzes for the more lucrative business of writing for the theatre.

The son of a Jewish family, he studied music in Berlin under Max Bruch, and became an orchestral conductor, working at the Überbrettl cabaret. He went back to Vienna and began writing operettas, becoming a serious rival to Franz Lehár. When Lehár's popular The Merry Widow premiered in 1905, Straus was said to have remarked "Das kann ich auch!" (I can also do that!). In 1939, following the Nazi Anschluss, he fled to Paris, where he received the honour of a Chevalier of the Légion d'honneur, and then to Hollywood. After the war, he returned to Europe, and settled at Bad Ischl, where he died. His grave is in the Bad Ischl Friedhof.

Straus' best-known works are Ein Walzertraum (A Waltz Dream), and The Chocolate Soldier (Der tapfere Soldat). The waltz arrangement from the former is probably his most enduring orchestral work. Among his most famous works is the theme from the 1950 film La Ronde.

Works

Operettas

Die lustigen Nibelungen (The Merry Nibelungs) – 1904
Zur indischen Witwe – 1905
Hugdietrichs Brautfahrt (Hugdietrich's Honeymoon) – 1906
Ein Walzertraum (A Waltz Dream) – 1907
Der tapfere Soldat (The Gallant Soldier, The Chocolate Soldier) – 1908
Didi – 1908
Das Tal der Liebe – 1909
Mein junger Herr (My Son John) – 1910
Die kleine Freundin (My Little Friend) – 1911
Der tapfere Cassian (The Brave Cassian) – 1912
The Dancing Viennese – 1912
Love and Laughter – 1913
Rund um die Liebe – 1914
Liebeszauber – 1916
Eine Ballnacht – 1918
Der letzte Walzer (The Last Waltz) – 1920
Die Perlen der Cleopatra – 1923
Die Teresina – 1925
Die Königin – 1926
Marietta – [1927 in French, 1928 in German]
Die Musik kommt – 1928
Eine Frau, die weiß, was sie will – 1932
Drei Walzer (Three Waltzes) – 1935
Ihr erster Walzer (revised version, Die Musik kommt) – 1950
Bozena – 1952

Ballets
Colombine – 1904
Die Prinzessin von Tragant – 1912

Orchestral music
Piano Concerto in B Minor – 1893
Serenade for String Orchestra in G Minor, Op. 35 – 1905

Film scores
A Lady's Morals – 1930
Danube Love Song – 1931 (never released due to backlash against musicals)
The Smiling Lieutenant – 1931
The Southerner – 1932
One Hour with You – 1932
 The Gentleman from Maxim's – 1933
Frühlingsstimmen – 1934
Land Without Music – 1935
Make a Wish – 1935
 Sarajevo – 1940
La Ronde – 1950

References

Further reading
Grun, Bernard: Prince of Vienna: the Life, Times and Melodies of Oscar Straus (London, 1955).
Gänzl, Kurt. The Encyclopedia of Musical Theatre (3 volumes). New York: Schirmer Books, 2001.
Traubner, Richard. Operetta: A Theatrical History. Garden City, New York: Doubleday & Company, 1983.

External links 

 List of Straus's stage works, with information and links
 List of stage works, operone.de
 
 

1870 births
1954 deaths
19th-century Austrian composers
20th-century Austrian composers
20th-century classical composers
Austrian film score composers
Austrian opera composers
Male opera composers
Austrian Jews
Jewish composers
Austrian Romantic composers
Composers from Vienna
Chevaliers of the Légion d'honneur
Austrian refugees
Austrian male classical composers
20th-century male musicians
19th-century male musicians
Burials at the Bad Ischl Friedhof